Chris Schiller (born January 18, 1977) is a lacrosse player for the Rochester Knighthawks in the National Lacrosse League. In 2006, he was named the team's Unsung Hero. Schiller also plays for the Toronto Nationals of Major League Lacrosse (MLL).

Schiller was born in Rochester, New York. He works as an Endoscopic Account Specialist for Johnson & Johnson. He majored in marketing at Penn State University and is married to his wife Jennifer.

References
 Bio at Rochester Knighthawks web site

1977 births
Living people
Rochester Knighthawks players
American lacrosse players
Sportspeople from Rochester, New York